A foreign, comparative, and international law librarian, also known as FCIL librarian, is a law librarian specialist who works specifically with three primary varieties of extra-jurisdictional law.  FCIL librarians work with foreign law, comparative law, and international law.  Foreign laws are the laws of any international jurisdiction. Comparative laws are “the scholarly study of the similarities and differences between the legal systems of different jurisdictions.” International law is the law of international organizations, such as the United Nations, and the laws between nations, such as those established by treaty.

References

Librarians